Gino Girolimoni (1 October 1889 – 19 November 1961) was an Italian photographer wrongly accused of killing children in Rome during the era of Fascist Italy. The film Girolimoni, il mostro di Roma recounts the persecution that Girolimoni underwent in spite of his innocence.

References

1889 births
1961 deaths
Italian photographers